Thihathura Tin Aung Myint Oo (born 29 May 1949) is a Burmese former military official and politician who served as First Vice President of Myanmar from 30 March 2011 to 1 July 2012. He is also chairman of Burmese Trade Council, having been appointed in November 2007 by Than Shwe, in response to Saffron Revolution demonstrations in October of that year, and Minister of Military Affairs. He joined the Buddhist monkhood on 3 May, after speculation over his disappearance had circulated throughout news media.

Military career
Tin graduated from the 12th intake of the Defence Services Academy and subsequently earned the title "Thihathura" in 1980 for fighting the Communist Party of Burma. He was nominated into the State Peace and Development Council in 2007 as Secretary (1), replacing Thein Sein, and was promoted to general in March 2009.

Political career
In the 2010 Burmese general election, he contested the Pobbathiri Township constituency and won a seat in the Pyithu Hluttaw, reportedly winning 90.57% of the votes. Tin Aung Myint Oo was sworn in as a Vice-President on 30 March 2011, along with Sai Mauk Kham and thereafter vacated his parliamentary seat. He is one of the wealthiest members in the former SPDC, and is well known for close ties with Zaw Zaw, a Burmese tycoon. He formerly served as the chairman of Myanmar Economics Corporation (MEC), an conglomerate owned by the Burmese military.

On 1 July 2012, he submitted his resignation as vice president, citing health reasons.

Personal life 
Tin Aung Myint Oo is married to Khin Saw Hnin and has a son, Naing Lin Oo, a military captain.

References

Burmese military personnel
1949 births
Living people
Vice-presidents of Myanmar
Defence Services Academy alumni
Burmese generals
Union Solidarity and Development Party politicians